Sal da Vinci is an Italian actor and singer who won the Festival Italiano in 1994 and took third place in the 2009 Sanremo Music Festival.  While born in New York City, he lives primarily in Naples, Italy with a repertoire of Neapolitan songs.

Notes

http://www.allmusic.com/artist/sal-da-vinci-mn0000287403

Living people
Italian male actors
Italian male singers
Year of birth missing (living people)